Adam Rothenberg (born June 20, 1975) is an American actor, best known for his role as Capt. Homer Jackson in the BBC One drama mystery series Ripper Street (2012–16). In film, he has starred in Mad Money (2008) as Bob Truman, Tennessee (2008) as Carter, and The Immigrant (2013) as Officer DeKeiffer.

Early life
Rothenberg was born to Gillian and Kenneth Rothenberg in Tenafly, New Jersey on June 20, 1975, and graduated from Tenafly High School in 1998. He is of Jewish ancestry on his father's side and has two brothers and three sisters. In 2008, he revealed to People that, before turning to acting, he was a garbage man, a fact-checker for Mademoiselle, and a security guard. Rothenberg trained as an actor at The Acting Studio - New York under James Price in New York City; while there, he performed numerous roles with Chelsea Repertory Company & LAB. From 1996 to 1997, he served in the United States Army, based in Germany.

Career
Rothenberg has performed on television, in film and in theatre. In New York, Rothenberg has starred in many Off-Broadway productions. These include the lead in Second Stage Theatre's revival of Danny and the Deep Blue Sea (2004), as well as his critically acclaimed role in The Women's Project's Birdy (2003). In 2006, Rothenberg played the Scottish storyteller Chimney Bosch in the MCC Theater's The Wooden Breeks, directed by Trip Cullman. Outside of New York, Rothenberg starred opposite Patricia Clarkson as Stanley Kowalski in A Streetcar Named Desire at the Kennedy Center's Tennessee Williams Festival (2004). 

At the Williamstown Theatre Festival, he starred as Doug in Alexandra Gersten-Vassilaros's Mother of Invention (2003), directed by Nicholas Martin, and as Lord Darlington in Lady Windermere's Fan (2005), directed by Moisés Kaufman. In 2011, he starred as Nils Krogstad in A Doll's House. Rothenberg then starred in the Mark Taper Forum's 2011 production of Burn This. Other theatre performances include Finder's Fee at the Edinburgh Fringe Festival, A Steady Rain, The Center of Gravity, Mad Forest, I'm Really Here and Almost Like Being.

In his television work, Rothenberg filmed one of the lead roles, Evan Wexler, in Fox's unaired television pilot Damages, and was also one of the leads, Eddie Caprio, in the comedy series Misconceptions, which also did not air. In 2008, he appeared as David "Augie" Augustine in the comedy-drama series The Ex List. Since 2012, he has had a starring role in the BBC One drama mystery television series Ripper Street, portraying Capt. Homer Jackson. In 2015, he was cast in the pilot of ABC's crime drama series Wicked City as Detective Jack Roth, an officer searching for a serial killer on the Sunset Strip. His role was recast in July 2015 after the show received its ABC airdate, and the role was instead given to Jeremy Sisto.

Personal life
Rothenberg married actress Charlene McKenna in January 2021 at Castle Leslie, Glaslough.

Filmography

Film

Television

Theatre

Notes

External links
 

1975 births
21st-century American male actors
American male film actors
American male television actors
American people of Jewish descent
Living people
Male actors from New Jersey
People from Tenafly, New Jersey
Tenafly High School alumni
20th-century American male actors